James Edward Canavan (November 26, 1866, in New Bedford, Massachusetts – May 27, 1949), was a former professional baseball player who played outfield and infield from - in the American Association and National League.

External links

1866 births
1949 deaths
Major League Baseball outfielders
Major League Baseball second basemen
Major League Baseball shortstops
Baseball players from Massachusetts
Cincinnati Kelly's Killers players
Milwaukee Brewers (AA) players
Chicago Colts players
Cincinnati Reds players
Brooklyn Bridegrooms players
19th-century baseball players
Sportspeople from New Bedford, Massachusetts
Minor league baseball managers
Manchester Farmers players
Rockford (minor league baseball) players
Portsmouth Lillies players
Omaha Omahogs players
Omaha Lambs players
Indianapolis Hoosiers (minor league) players
Indianapolis Indians players
Providence Grays (minor league) players
Providence Clamdiggers (baseball) players
New Haven Blues players
Wheeling Stogies players
Norwich Reds players
New Bedford Whalers (baseball) players